Who Killed Malcolm X? is a 2020 documentary miniseries directed by Rachel Dretzin and Phil Bertelsen. Produced by Fusion, the series began streaming on Netflix on February 7, 2020.

The documentary follows the work of Abdur-Rahman Muhammad, a historian and tour guide in Washington, D.C., who for more than 30 years has been investigating the assassination of Malcolm X. The documentary investigates the allegations made in the 1977 Hayer affidavits. In the affidavits Talmadge Hayer, a convicted assassin of Malcolm X, stated that the two men convicted alongside him were innocent, and that his four co-conspirators were Benjamin Thomas, Leon Davis, William X, and a man by the name of Wilbur or Kinly, all from the Nation of Islam mosque in Newark.

Following the release of the miniseries, the Manhattan district attorney announced that the district attorney’s office will begin a preliminary review of the investigation into Malcolm X's murder in order to decide whether the case should be reopened. On November 17, 2021, Manhattan district attorney announced that convictions of Muhammad A. Aziz and Khalil Islam, who both served 20 years in prison for the murder of Malcolm X, would be thrown out. In November 2022, Aziz and Islam were awarded a combined total of $26 million by New York City and a further $10 million from the state.

Episodes 
Episode 1 – Marked Man
Episode 2 – Straight Man in a Crooked Game
Episode 3 – Black Messiah
Episode 4 – Showdown
Episode 5 – Shotgun Man
Episode 6 – Legacies

References

External links 

2020 American television series debuts
2020s American television miniseries
2020s American documentary television series
English-language Netflix original programming
Documentaries about historical events
Works about assassinations in the United States
Netflix original documentary television series
Works about Malcolm X